Gigi Fernández and Natasha Zvereva were the defending champions but only Zvereva competed that year with Lori McNeil.

McNeil and Zvereva lost in the semifinals to Marianne Werdel and Tami Whitlinger-Jones.

Gabriela Sabatini and Brenda Schultz won in the final 5–7, 7–6, 6–4 against Werdel and Whitlinger-Jones.

Seeds
Champion seeds are indicated in bold text while text in italics indicates the round in which those seeds were eliminated.

 Lori McNeil /  Natasha Zvereva (semifinals)
 Lisa Raymond /  Pam Shriver (semifinals)
 Gabriela Sabatini /  Brenda Schultz (champions)
 Katrina Adams /  Zina Garrison-Jackson (quarterfinals)

Draw

External links
 1995 Ameritech Cup Doubles draw

Ameritech Cup
1995 WTA Tour
1995 in sports in Illinois
1995 in American tennis